Ulf Hielscher (born 30 November 1967 in Neubrandenburg, GDR) is a German bobsledder who competed in the 1990s. He won a bronze medal in the four-man event at the 1994 Winter Olympics in Lillehammer.

Hielscher also won a gold medal in the four-man event at the 1995 FIBT World Championships in Winterberg.

References
 Bobsleigh four-man Olympic medalists for 1924, 1932-56, and since 1964
 Bobsleigh four-man world championship medalists since 1930
 DatabaseOlympics.com profile

1967 births
Living people
People from Neubrandenburg
Bobsledders at the 1994 Winter Olympics
German male bobsledders
Olympic bobsledders of Germany
Olympic bronze medalists for Germany
Olympic medalists in bobsleigh
Medalists at the 1994 Winter Olympics
Sportspeople from Mecklenburg-Western Pomerania